Mix 96.7 is a station identifier that includes the following radio stations:


Radio stations

Canada
CILT-FM, in Steinbach, Manitoba
CHYR-FM, in Leamington, Ontario

United States
KHIX, in Carlin, Nevada
WBVI, in Findlay, Ohio
WMXA, in Auburn, Alabama
WLTN-FM, in Lisbon, New Hampshire
KSYV, in Solvang, California
WLXV, in Cadillac, Michigan
WHTQ, in Whiting, Wisconsin

See also
Mix FM (disambiguation)